is a retired long-distance runner from Japan. He represented his native country at the 1988 Summer Olympics. His personal bests were 13:46.29 in the 5,000 metres and 28:45.89 in the 10,000 metres, both achieved at the 1987 World Championships.

Achievements

References

1960 births
Living people
Sportspeople from Tochigi Prefecture
Japanese male long-distance runners
Olympic male long-distance runners
Olympic athletes of Japan
Athletes (track and field) at the 1988 Summer Olympics
World Athletics Championships athletes for Japan
Asian Athletics Championships winners
Japan Championships in Athletics winners
20th-century Japanese people
21st-century Japanese people